Jérémy Victor Pied (born 23 February 1989) is a French professional footballer who plays as a right-back.

Club career

Lyon

Born in Grenoble, Pied made his Ligue 1 debut for Olympique Lyonnais on the opening day of the 2010–11 season against Monaco, coming on from the bench in the 76th minute for Bafétimbi Gomis in a goalless draw. He made a first Ligue 1 start in the game against Valenciennes in week 5 and scored a headed goal in the 26th minute from Jimmy Briand's cross. The match ended 1–1 with Pied being named the man of the match by L'Équipe. On 14 September 2010, he played his first UEFA Champions League match against Schalke 04, entering shortly after the hour mark, replacing Michel Bastos,  the goalscorer in the 1–0 victory. Pied's promising performances earned him the trust of Claude Puel and he started playing regularly starting matches or coming in from the bench. On 2 October 2010, he played the full match against Nancy and made an assist to the second goal of the match scored by Briand. Lyon eventually won the game 3–2. On 17 October 2010, Pied again made the starting lineup in a vital match against Lille. After all four goals of the game were scored, he quickly picked up two yellow cards which saw him expelled from the game, but Lyon held on and won the game 3–1. On 14 November 2010, he volleyed the only goal of the match, and his second goal of the season, against Nice after Yoann Gourcuff's cross. On 3 December 2010, Olympique Lyonnais announced contract extension for Pied for two years until June 2014. Pied scored his third goal for Lyon in 4–0 victory over Nancy coming off the bench in the 69th minute and scoring a header from a Michel Bastos cross.

He scored his first 2011–12 Ligue 1 season goal on 27 August 2011 against Montpellier.

Nice
On 26 August 2012, Pied completed a move to Ligue 1 rivals OGC Nice, signing a four-year contract for €3 million transfer fee. He was loaned for the 2014–15 season to En Avant de Guingamp.

Southampton

On 1 August 2016, Pied rejoined manager Claude Puel for the third time in his career when he signed a two-year deal with Southampton, joining on a free transfer. He made his Southampton debut as a substitute against Watford on 13 August 2016. 12 days later, Pied suffered a knee injury that would keep him out for the rest of the season.

Pied eventually returned to League action on 3 December 2017, when he played the full 90 minutes in a 1–1 draw at AFC Bournemouth. At the end of the 2017–18 season, his contract with Southampton was not renewed.

Lille
In August 2018, free agent Pied signed a two-year deal with Lille.

Career statistics

Honours
Lyon
Coupe de France: 2011–12
Trophée des Champions: 2012

Lille
Ligue 1: 2020–21
Trophée des Champions: 2021

References

External links

1989 births
Living people
Sportspeople from Grenoble
French footballers
France youth international footballers
France under-21 international footballers
Association football defenders
Association football midfielders
Olympique Lyonnais players
FC Metz players
OGC Nice players
En Avant Guingamp players
Southampton F.C. players
Lille OSC players
Ligue 1 players
Ligue 2 players
Premier League players
French expatriate footballers
Expatriate footballers in England
French expatriate sportspeople in England
Footballers from Auvergne-Rhône-Alpes